The Kathmandu trolleybus system once served Kathmandu, the capital city of the then Kingdom of Nepal.  It was the only trolleybus system ever to be constructed in that country.

It endured a somewhat chequered history, particularly in the first decade of the 21st century. Operation was suspended completely for almost two years, from 19 December 2001 until 1 September 2003, because of maintenance, financial and political issues. When service was reinstated in 2003, it did not cover the route's outer half, between Koteshwor and Surya Binak, serving only about 5 km between Tripureshwor and Koteshwor.

Operations on the system were suspended again, and for the final time, in late , and the system was formally closed (without ever resuming operation) in November 2009.

See also

History of Kathmandu
Transport in Kathmandu
List of trolleybus systems

References

External links

In memory of Kathmandu Trolleybus 
YouTube video, Kathmandu trolleybuses in 1979, 2:05 min

Transport in Kathmandu
Kathmandu
Kathmandu
History of transport in Nepal
1975 establishments in Nepal
2009 disestablishments in Nepal